The Triple J Hottest 100 is an annual music listener poll hosted by the publicly funded national Australian youth radio station Triple J. Members of the public are invited to vote for their favourite Australian and alternative music of the year in an online poll conducted two weeks prior to the new year.

From 1989 to 2018, the 100 most popular songs were counted down from 12 pm on Australia Day. Since then, the countdown has been held on the fourth weekend of January due to increasing controversy about Australia Day regarding its marking of the colonisation of Australia and dispossession of Aboriginal and Torres Strait Islander land.

Typically, on the day after the Hottest 100, Triple J has played the Hottest 200 ("the songs that didn't quite make it") from 10 am.

The poll has grown from 500,000 votes in 2004 to a peak of over 3.2 million in 2019, and it has been referred to as "the world's greatest music democracy". Since 2015, the countdown has raised at least $3.3 million for various Australian charity partners, including Lifeline, through merchandise sales. ABC Music issued physical compilation albums following each year's countdown until 2022. Australian musician Flume's song "Say Nothing" featuring May-a, is the latest song to top the Hottest 100.

History

1988–1991: The Hot 100
The idea for the poll came from Triple J producer Lawrie Zion in late 1988. During this time, he conceived the idea of running a listener poll to determine their 100 favourite songs of all time. The idea was taken from Brisbane community radio station 4ZZZ, which developed the original Hot 100 in 1976.

For the Hot 100, before Triple J had become a national broadcaster, Sydney listeners were required to write their 10 favourite tracks on the back of an envelope. Some entries were sent into the station written on a variety of items, including paintings, sculptures, and hand-rolled cannabis cigarettes. The results of the first poll were counted down on Sunday 5 March 1989 between 10am and 6pm.

The station repeated the event the following year when it started broadcasting to other capital cities besides Sydney. In 1991, Triple J was forced to change the poll's name to 'Hottest 100' to avoid legal action with 4ZZZ.

During the poll's first few years — from 1989 to 1991 — the winner in the first two years was "Love Will Tear Us Apart" by Joy Division, while 1991's favourite song was "Smells Like Teen Spirit" by Nirvana, which had been released that year.

1992–1995: The Hottest 100

Realising that the poll's results were unlikely to significantly change from year to year, Triple J rested the Hottest 100 in 1992 and relaunched it as an annual poll the following year. The newly launched poll required listeners to vote for their favourite songs of that year. Denis Leary's comedy anthem "Asshole" was voted number 1 in 1993.

The inaugural Hottest 100 compilation CD, Triple J Hottest 100 (The Hottest Of The Hottest), was released by ABC Music in 1994. Denis Leary's "Asshole" was voted in the number-one position in that year, while the radio-edited version of Ween's "Push the Little Daisies", featuring a sample of musician Prince howling in place of the word "shit", appeared on the CD.

1996–2016: Rise in Australian music 
In 1996, Spiderbait became the first Australian act to reach number 1. Since 1999, Australian acts have made up the majority of the polls.

The first Hottest 100 DVD, Triple J Hottest 100: The Hottest Videos For 2002, was released in 2002. Queens of the Stone Age's "No One Knows" was voted into the top position in that year, while Grinspoon, Motor Ace, Darren Hanlon, Machine Translations and Ms Dynamite were other Hottest 100 artists featured on the release.

In 2003, Powderfinger became the first act to be featured three times in the top-10 poll, with "(Baby I've Got You) On My Mind", "Sunsets" and "Love Your Way" placing in the 4th, 7th and 10th places, respectively. All three songs appeared on the 2003 Vulture Street full-length studio album, which attained "6 x Platinum" sales in Australia.

After its beginnings as a write-in poll, the Hottest 100 progressed to phone-in voting, which then progressed to SMS and online voting. In 2003, only web votes through the Triple J website were accepted, with registration required and a limit of 10 votes applied. In 2004, the guidelines were expanded so that voters were entitled to 10 internet votes and 10 SMS votes.

In 2014, Chet Faker, stage name of Nick Murphy, repeated Powderfinger's achievement from 2003 by placing three times in the top 10 positions. Faker reached the number-one spot with "Talk Is Cheap" and the 7th and 8th positions, respectively, with "Gold" and "1998". All three songs came from Faker's 2014 album Built On Glass. Chet Faker placed a total of four times in the entire poll, with a cover version of Sonia Dada's "You Don't Treat Me No Good" in the 22nd position. The 2014 Hottest 100 poll received a still-standing record of 2,099,707 million votes, cast by 258,762 voters from 188 countries.

2015: #Tay4Hottest100
Following a 13 January 2015 article on BuzzFeed, the "#Tay4Hottest100" hashtag campaign began during the voting period for the Hottest 100 poll for 2014 to promote Taylor Swift's hit single "Shake It Off". According to those critical of the campaign, the Hottest 100 is reserved for non-mainstream artists who were "discovered or fostered by Triple J" and provides valuable exposure for artists in the outer circles of the music industry.

The campaign led to discussion about the broader cultural implications of the controversy generated by Swift. The Guardians Elle Hunt wrote: "... the virulent response to #Tay4Hottest100 has revealed the persistence of a dichotomy I'd thought we'd thrown out long ago: that of high art versus low." Writing for The Conversation on 23 January 2015, Charles Darwin University academic Gemma Blackwood concluded:

The cultural and economic meanings attached to the celebrity-sign of "Taylor Swift" seems antithetical to Triple J's self-representation as a place for exciting new music, with a supposed focus on emerging Australian talent. This perhaps explains why Swift is excluded from the playlist when other "mainstream" American artists and chart toppers ... are still played on the station heavily: the alignment and transfer of values of what is considered "cool" and "hip" between the station and its chosen artists ... The concept of "youth" seems to be used in reference to a musical market and to identify particular music genres rather than being a real or an accurate signifier of young tastes and interests. It raises the question: what responsibility does a national youth broadcaster have in the shaping and the adapting of young musical interests?

Station manager Chris Scaddan told the media that the Swift campaign was within the rules of the poll, later instructing Triple J employees not to comment to "media, friends, family" about the campaign, as "it will all become clear when we get to the countdown next Monday." The station said: "we don't comment on voting campaigns whilst Hottest 100 voting is open. It draws attention to them and may influence the results of the poll." Marketing website Mumbrella suggested on 20 January that a Facebook post by KFC incorporating the "#Tay4Hottest100" hashtag was against the Hottest 100 rules and could see Swift disqualified. The Guardian submitted a freedom of information request to the ABC in regard to the station's response to the campaign.

After journalist Peter Vincent reported that the Swift campaign had "swallowed" the Hottest 100 for 2014, citing research from the University of Queensland that showed that over 7,341 Hottest 100 posts in a 30-day period leading up to the poll results related to Swift, "Shake It Off" was eventually disqualified by the radio station in an announcement on 26 January 2015. The official announcement read: "it became pretty clear, pretty quick[,] that a lot of people just wanted to prod some 'hipsters' for the lulz", acknowledging that the station "had a heap of fun" with the campaign, while also acknowledging Swift is "smart", "cool" and "successful". The song would have placed in 12th position if it had been allowed to compete.

On the inside cover of the Triple J Hottest 100 Volume 22 CD, bold capital initials spell out "TAYLOR SWIFT BAN".

2017–present: Announcement of date change 

In mid-2016, support grew for a campaign calling on Triple J to change the date of the Hottest 100 due to ongoing debate about the meaning of the date of Australia Day to Indigenous Australians. Calls were led by Indigenous activists. Australian hip hop duo A.B. Original and their anti-Australia Day single "January 26" were instrumental in drawing support to the cause. Triple J responded to the campaign in September 2016, announcing a review over whether the date of the Hottest 100 should be changed.

The review of the date continued into 2017, including consultation with Reconciliation Australia, the National Congress of Australia's First Peoples, and the National Australia Day Council, while 2016's Hottest 100 was held on Australia Day without change. In August 2017, Triple J launched a survey asking for public opinion on whether the date should be changed.

In 2017, Triple J announced that they would no longer hold the Hottest 100 on January 26, citing "growing dialogue around Indigenous recognition and perspectives on 26 January." Instead, the Hottest 100 would be held on the 4th weekend of January each year, beginning with the 2017 countdown on 27 January 2018.

Some organisations offered alternatives to Triple J's Hottest 100 in response to the date change. These include nationwide rock radio station Triple M broadcasting an Ozzest 100 countdown of only Australian songs on 26 January, and Senator Cory Bernardi's Australian Conservatives publishing an AC100 playlist of Australian music on Spotify.

Hottest 100 top tens and summaries

Fundraising history 
Since the 2015 countdown, Triple J has annually partnered with an Australian organisation to donate all funds raised from Hottest 100 merchandise – usually a T-shirt branded with the countdown's logo. In total, these fundraisers have raised over $3.3 million for a variety of causes that the broadcaster deems "most important" to listeners each year.

Notable artists

Since its inception, the group acts who have been featured the most in the annual countdown are Hilltop Hoods, who have appeared 24 times between the 2003 and 2022 countdowns (unofficially including a feature with Thundamentals in 2017); Powderfinger, with 22 songs between 1996 and 2009; and Foo Fighters, who charted 22 times between 1995 and 2014 (in 2011, it was incorrectly stated that Foo Fighters had the most appearances). Powderfinger's frontman, Bernard Fanning, has taken the top spot on three occasions, twice with Powderfinger in 1999 and 2000, and once as a solo artist in 2005; only one other artist, Flume (twice) has topped an annual countdown more than once. Dave Grohl, frontman of the Foo Fighters, has appeared in annual countdowns 32 times, including five times with Queens of the Stone Age in 2002, four times with Nirvana, and once with Them Crooked Vultures.

If charting the number of countdowns an artist has appeared in, rather than the number of their songs that have been voted in, the Foo Fighters still hold the record; their songs have featured in 13 of the annual countdowns, including a streak of six consecutive appearances between 1995 and 2000. However, the record for the most consecutive appearances belongs to The Living End, who had at least one song appear in every annual countdown for ten years, between 1997 and 2006.

When including all of Triple J's countdowns (adding the five Hottest 100 of All Time countdowns, the 2011 Australian Albums countdown, and the 2013 Twenty Years countdown), The Cure has made more appearances than any other band, with 31 entries in the All Time countdowns and five in the yearly countdowns. Powderfinger and Silverchair have been featured 30 and 28 times, respectively, in total. As for individuals, Dave Grohl has achieved 47 entries (24 with Foo Fighters, 15 with Nirvana, seven with Queens of the Stone Age, and one with Them Crooked Vultures), Bernard Fanning has 33 (30 with Powderfinger, three as a solo artist), and Robert Smith has 32 (31 with The Cure, one from a solo collaboration with Crystal Castles in 2010).

See also

KROQ Top 106.7 Countdowns
Festive Fifty

References

External links
Hottest 100 section of the Triple J website
Chart of artists with most Hottest 100 entries 1993 – 2015

 
1989 radio programme debuts
1989 establishments in Australia
Australian record charts
Top lists